Turanoniscus is a monotypic genus of crustaceans belonging to the monotypic family Turanoniscidae. The only species is Turanoniscus anacanthotermitis.

References

Isopoda
Isopod genera
Monotypic crustacean genera